Timothy L. Connolly (born May 7, 1981) is an American former professional ice hockey player who played eleven seasons in the National Hockey League (NHL) for the New York Islanders, Buffalo Sabres, and Toronto Maple Leafs.

Playing career
As a youth, Connolly played in the 1993, 1994 and 1995 Quebec International Pee-Wee Hockey Tournaments with a minor ice hockey team from Syracuse, New York.

Connolly played for the Erie Otters of the Ontario Hockey League (OHL) for two seasons, beginning in 1997–98.  After recording 68 points in 46 games in his second OHL season, he was drafted fifth overall by the New York Islanders in the 1999 NHL Entry Draft.

On June 24, 2001, at the NHL Entry Draft, Connolly and Taylor Pyatt were traded by the Islanders to the Buffalo Sabres for captain Michael Peca. After missing only three regular season games total in his first four seasons in the league, injuries began to plague Connolly's career beginning in 2003–04.  He missed the entire season with post-concussion syndrome after suffering a concussion in a pre-season game versus the Chicago Blackhawks. During the 2004–05 NHL lockout, he played the second half of the season with SC Langnau in the Swiss Nationalliga A.

In the 2006 playoffs, he recorded 11 points in 8 post-season games including the game-tying goal with 10.7 seconds left in game one of the second round series against the Ottawa Senators (which Buffalo won 7–6 in overtime). In game two, however, Connolly was injured with another concussion and missed the rest of the playoffs.  Continuing to suffer from post-concussion syndrome, Connolly missed the first 80 games of the 2006–07 season. Connolly was known in the NHL for his puck-handling skills,  however, he had been criticized for playing with his head down which many link to his concussion problems. With a reputation of being fragile player, Connolly has missed many games because of subsequent injuries.

He returned to action on April 7, 2007, against the Washington Capitals, recording 13 minutes of ice time and scoring a goal; he was named second star for the game, which the Sabres won, 2–0. Connolly had bone spur problems with his hip all throughout the 2007–08 season and had season-ending surgery to have them removed on March 21, 2008.

The 2008–09 season saw the continuation of Connolly's injury problems. He began the season with two cracked vertebrae from a stick-butt to the back in a pre-season game, which forced him to miss the first 10 games of the regular season. After five games, in which he registered six points, he suffered a broken rib from a devastating hit by the St. Louis Blues' Keith Tkachuk. Despite playing through the pain in the next game, the injury subsequently pulled Connolly out of the lineup once again.  On January 9, 2009, Connolly returned to the lineup to finish the season with 47 points in 48 games.

On March 4, 2009 at the NHL Trade Deadline, Connolly was re-signed by the Buffalo Sabres to a two-year, $9 million contract. In 2009–10, Connolly had a career-high 65 points in 73 regular season games.

On July 2, 2011, Connolly was signed as an unrestricted free agent by the Toronto Maple Leafs to a two-year, $9.5 million contract.

On November 7, 2011, it was reported that Connolly was injured again, this time with an upper-body injury, and would miss between 10 days and two weeks.

On January 17, 2013, in the final year of his contract with the Maple Leafs and prior to the lockout shortened 2012–13 season, Connolly was placed on waivers. Upon clearing the following day it was announced that Connolly would start the season with the Leafs affiliate, the Toronto Marlies in the American Hockey League.

Career statistics

Regular season and playoffs

International

References

External links

1981 births
Living people
American men's ice hockey centers
Buffalo Sabres players
Erie Otters players
Ice hockey players from New York (state)
National Hockey League first-round draft picks
New York Islanders draft picks
New York Islanders players
Sportspeople from Syracuse, New York
Toronto Maple Leafs players
Toronto Marlies players
People from Baldwinsville, New York